The National Anthem of Zimbabwe, also known by its incipit in Shona, "", and the final line of each verse in Ndebele, "", was introduced in March 1994 after a nationwide competition to replace the South African-derived "Ishe Komborera Africa" with a distinctly Zimbabwean song. The winning entry was a Shona song written by Professor Solomon Mutswairo and composed by Fred Changundega. It was translated into English and Ndebele, the two other main languages of Zimbabwe. The Ndebele version is mainly sung in the Matebeleland regions of Zimbabwe, while the English version is not commonly sung. Some schools in Matabeleland South have introduced the Sotho/Tswana version.

Lyrics 

Because Zimbabwe has 16 national languages, the lyrics of the original Shona song were translated into the other 15 national languages as part of the 2013 constitutional reforms. The official texts were laid out in the 2013 Constitution, however the final English text in the Constitution varied from the more poetic and metrical version that had been in common usage up to that point and remains so today. Both the new official text and the more common variant are listed below.

In spite of all the translations being official and of equal standing according to the Constitution, the Shona and Ndebele versions remain the two most prevalent variants in regular usage.

English lyrics

Shona and Ndebele lyrics

In other regional languages

See also 
 National Anthem of Rhodesia

Notes

References

External links 

Zimbabwe
Zimbabwean culture
National symbols of Zimbabwe
National anthem compositions in G major